Sosnowica may refer to the following villages in Poland:

 Sosnowica, Lublin Voivodeship (east Poland)
 Sosnowica, Masovian Voivodeship (east-central Poland)

See also 
Sosnowica-Dwór